DZIDZIO (Ukrainian: ДЗІДЗЬО) is a Ukrainian band with a comedic bent to their music.

This band was founded on 9 September 2009 in Novoyavorivsk, Lviv Oblast.  It gained its popularity on the internet in part due to their "fourth member", a pig named Meison, with his snout serving as the band logo.

The band released two albums, ХА-ХА-ХА (Ha Ha Ha) (2012) DZIDZIO Хіти (DZIDZIO Hits) (2014).

DZIDZIO performed benefit concerts in support of the Euromaidan movement.

The band appeared at the end of the first episode of the first season of the TV series Servant of the People and performed Sama-sama.

Discography

Albums

DZIDZIO SUPER-PUPER, 2018

DZIDZIO Hity, 2014

HA-HA-HA, 2012

Singles

Music videos

Music videos (DZIDZIOFILM)

Awards and nominations

References

External links 
 Official website in English; also available in Ukrainian and Polish

Ukrainian pop music groups
Musical groups established in 2009